Robert Browe (died 1451), of Teigh and , Rutland, was an English politician.

He was the son of MP, Hugh Browe. He was a Member of the Parliament of England (MP) for Rutland in 1407, April 1414, 1419, 1423, 1429, 1431 and 1439.

Description 

Robert Browe, esquire to Walter Busshell and others: Appointment of an attorney to give seisin of all his lands, etc.: Ches.

References

14th-century births
1451 deaths
People from Rutland
English MPs 1407
English MPs April 1414
English MPs 1419
English MPs 1423
English MPs 1429
English MPs 1431
English MPs 1439